Used Car Expert (UsedCarExpert.co.uk) is published by SDO Media Ltd, which publishes other car and automotive financial advice sites.

Background
Founded in 2005, UsedCarExpert.co.uk (or .com/.net) is a used car buying advice site for UK motorists, visited and read by around 4m car buyers per annum.

Car Buying Advice
They have a dedicated research program that uncovers the common car faults on used cars and publishes ways for the layman to spot and avoid these faults when buying a used car.

Their used car price guide is the first consumer price guide to show real average mileages and regional price adjustment.

They also have a significant used car review section, used car facts and figures resource and used cars for sale, both of which are regularly cited in the media.

Between 2008 and 2010 Used Car Expert published a magazine version of their website price guide and car reviews which sold in WH Smith and other newsagents around the UK, competing against What Car? and Parkers price guides. The magazine was endorsed by TV used car guru Mike Brewer.

Media Credits

 Used Car Expert was cited as consumer champion on BBC TV Show "Rip-Off Britain"
 A Used Car Expert employee answered used car buyers questions throughout 2007 and 2008 on Sunday Times Website, Times Online 
 He was also quoted on BBC online in relation to the British Motor Show  and interviewed on BBC TV and online in relation to car insurance valuations 
 Used Car Expert was Radio 2's website of the day 
 Used Car Expert is regularly quoted in the regional press, such as the Liverpool Echo, Daily Record, The Eastern Daily Press and many others.
 Used Car Expert advice was quoted in Shortlist magazine about future classic cars
 Used Car Expert price and depreciation analysis used in the Telegraph
 Used Car Expert advice cited in Confused.com used car review 
 Used Car Expert advice cited Daily Post North Wales used car review 
 Used Car Expert cam belt advice cited Cambridge news 
 Used Car Expert used car regional market price report featured in a 'This Is Hull' news story 
 Used Car Expert used car regional market price report featured in an Exchange & Mart news story 
 Used Car Expert used car regional market price report featured in a RAC news story 
 Used Car Expert used car regional market price report featured in a Yahoo / Press Association news story 
Used Car Expert's car price depreciation data used by The Mirror daily newspaper in the UK on 13 April 2012 to compile a top 10 list of car that lose the most and least money over 3 years
 Used Car Expert's car depreciation index features in Telegraph news story 
 Used Car Expert's regional car price analysis features in MSN  news story 
 Used Car Expert's analysis of regional differences in UK car prices in features in AOL news story 
 Used Car Expert's analysis of regional differences in UK car prices in features in MSN Money news story 
 Used Car Expert's analysis of regional differences in UK car prices is reported by ITV
 Used Car Expert's analysis of car prices in the South West makes is reported by ITV West Country 
 Used Car Expert's analysis of regional differences in UK car prices is reported by GreenFlag
 Used Car Expert's analysis of regional differences in UK car prices is reported by the RAC
 Used Car Expert's analysis of car prices in the South West makes is reported by Plymouth's Herald 

Other media credits include the now defunct News of the World, BBC Radio Oxford, BBC Radio London, Radio 5.

References

Automotive websites
Used car market